is a Japanese actor and fashion model from Tokyo.

Filmography
Tokusou Exceedraft (Guest star in episodes 30) - Tamotsu Moriyama
Tokkei Winspector (Guest star in episodes 31 and 32) - Yuuichi Hirosaki
Uchuu Keiji Gavan (Guest star in episode 38) - Policeman
Uchuu Keiji Sharivan (Guest star in episode 44)
Choushinsei Flashman (1986-1987) - Jin / Red Flash
Yearning (1993)

References

External links

1958 births
Living people
Japanese male actors
People from Tokyo